The 1982 Ugandan Super League was the 15th season of the official Ugandan football championship, the top-level football league of Uganda.

Overview
The 1982 Uganda Super League was contested by 10 teams and was won by SC Villa. It was the first time that the Ugandan football championship was known as the Uganda Super League, the shortened title Super Ten being used during the first season.

League standings

Leading goalscorer
The top goalscorer in the 1982 season was Issa Ssekatawa of Express FC with 22 goals.

References

External links
Uganda - List of Champions - RSSSF (Hans Schöggl)
Ugandan Football League Tables - League321.com

Ugandan Super League seasons
Uganda
Uganda
1